Bezawada may refer to:

 Vijayawada, a city in Andhra Pradesh, India
 Bejawada (film), 2011 Telugu film directed by Vivek Krishna

Persons with the given name
 Bezawada Bapa Naidou, Indian politician, first Mayor of Yanam
 Bezawada Gopala Reddy, Indian politician, Chief Minister of Andhra State
 Bezawada Ramachandra Reddy, Indian politician, one of the founders of the Swatantra Party
 Bezwada Wilson (born 1966), Indian human rights activist

Indian surnames